Daniel Movahedi (born 26 May 1985) is an English professional mixed martial arts referee and former fighter.

Career
Born in London, England, Dan Movahedi made his debut as a UFC referee during UFC Liverpool in 2018.

Mixed martial arts record 
Movahedi is 4–9 in professional MMA with two wins coming via submission and the other two via technical knockout.

|-
| Win
| align=center| 4–9
| Joe Stevenson
| Submission (rear-naked choke)
| UCMMA 19: Lights Out
| 
| align=center| 1
| align=center| 0:00
| London, England
|
|-
| Loss
| align=center| 3–9
| Ben Craggy
| TKO (punches)
| UCMMA 14: Invincible
| 
| align=center| 1
| align=center| 3:16
| London, England
|
|-
| Win
| align=center| 3–8
| Ryan Campbell
| TKO (punches)
| UCMMA 10: Resurrection
| 
| align=center| 1
| align=center| 1:16
| London, England
|
|-
| Win
| align=center| 2–8
| Michael Sidwell
| TKO (punches)
| UCMMA 7: Mayhem
| 
| align=center| 1
| align=center| 1:37
| London, England
|
|-
| No
| align=center| 1–8
| Adam Stanton
| Submission (arm-triangle choke)
| BAMMA 1: The Fighting Premiership
| 
| align=center| 1
| align=center| 1:08
| London, England
|
|-
| Win
| align=center| 1–7
| Darren Welsh
| Submission (triangle choke)
| UCMMA 2: Unbreakable
| 
| align=center| 1
| align=center| 2:47
| London, England
|
|-
| Loss
| align=center| 0–7
| Edgelson Lua
| KO (punch)
| Cage Rage Contenders 9
| 
| align=center| 1
| align=center| 0:30
| London, England
|
|-
| Loss
| align=center| 0–6
| Colin Gough
| Submission (arm-triangle choke)
| FCFN 5: Full Contact Fight Night 5
| 
| align=center| 1
| align=center| 0:52
| London, England
|
|-
| Loss
| align=center| 0–5
| Steve Dossett
| Submission (guillotine choke)
| Cage Rage Contenders 5
| 
| align=center| 1
| align=center| 0:53
| London, England
|
|-
| Loss
| align=center| 0–4
| Lloyd Clarkson
| KO (punch)
| Cage Rage Contenders 4
| 
| align=center| 1
| align=center| 3:15
| London, England
|
|-
| Loss
| align=center| 0–3
| Tony Machado
| Submission (rear-naked choke)
| Cage Rage Contenders 3
| 
| align=center| 1
| align=center| 1:56
| London, England
|
|-
| Loss
| align=center| 0–2
| Mark Haigh
| N/A
| UK-1: Ultimate Fight Night
| 
| align=center| 1
| align=center| 0:00
| Portsmouth, England
| 
|-
| Loss
| align=center| 0–1
| Brian Adams
| TKO
| FCFN 4: Full Contact Fight Night 4
| 
| align=center| 1
| align=center| 2:08
| London, England
|

References

External links 
 
 

1985 births
Living people
English male mixed martial artists
Iranian male mixed martial artists
Mixed martial arts referees
Sportspeople from London
Sportspeople of Iranian descent
English people of Iranian descent